Will Foster is an English musician who is known as the former keyboardist for the English rock band The Tears. Previously, he played with UK art rock band Delicatessen before forming Lodger - alongside Delicatessen singer Neil Carlill, Supergrass drummer Danny Goffey, and Goffey's wife Pearl Lowe. 
Since 2008, he has been associated with Jon Fratelli, playing keyboards and guitar with The Fratellis during their 2008/2009 live shows. When the band went on hiatus, he followed Jon Fratelli to his new band Codeine Velvet Club, where he also played keyboards and guitar during their 2009/2010 live shows. When the band disbanded he then played keyboard/piano with Jon's solo band.

References

British rock keyboardists
Living people
Place of birth missing (living people)
Year of birth missing (living people)